Pattern Languages of Programs is the name of a group of annual conferences sponsored by The Hillside Group. The purpose of these conferences is to develop and refine the art of software design patterns. Most of the effort focuses on developing a textual presentation of a pattern such that it becomes easy to understand and apply. This is typically done in a writers' workshop setting.

The flagship conference 
The flagship conference is called the Pattern Languages of Programs conference, abbreviated as PLoP. PLoP has been held in the U.S.A. since 1994. Until 2004 it was held annually at Allerton Park in Monticello, Illinois, a property of the University of Illinois at Urbana Champaign. Since then, its location has alternated between Allerton park and being co-located with OOPSLA, a large computer science conference, with the Agile Conference in 2009, and with PUARL in 2018.  The 27th PLoP will be held in Keystone, Colorado.

Notable people who chaired the conference in the past include Ward Cunningham, Richard Gabriel, Ralph Johnson, John Vlissides and Kent Beck.

PLoP (and several other Pattern Languages of Programs conferences) are sponsored  by The Hillside Group, a U.S.-based non-profit organization that holds the PLoP trademark and the rights to the conference.

Locations and Organizers

Other PLoP conferences

AsianPLoP
AsianPLoP is the PLoP event for the Asian community, commonly featuring patterns in both English and Japanese language.

ChiliPLoP
ChiliPLoP is an annual conference featuring "hot topics" of the PLoP community. It is held in the U.S. since 1998.

EuroPLoP
Held since 1996 in Kloster Irsee, Germany (former monastery, now Swabian Conference and Education Centre).

KoalaPLoP
Held in Australia or New Zealand.

MensorePLoP
MensorePLoP '2001, held on the island of Okinawa, Japan.

MiniPLoP
MiniPLoP'2011, held in IME/USP, São Paulo, Brazil.

ScrumPLoP

SugarLoafPLoP
SugarLoafPLoP, held in Brazil.

VikingPLoP
VikingPLoP, held mostly in the Scandinavian countries, but also moving around in Europe.

Publications 
The conference proceedings are typically published locally as technical reports of a sponsoring university. From 1998 to 2007, EuroPLoP papers were published annually by the German publisher Universitätsverlag Konstanz.

Between 2008 and 2012 proceedings appeared in several places. CEUR-WS holds papers for 2008 and papers for 2009 (in addition a complete set of 2009 papers are available from Lulu.com in printed and PDF formats). A printed version of EuroPLoP 2012 papers are also available on Lulu.com.

Since 2012 a subset of EuroPLoP papers have been submitted to the ACM Digital Library.

After the conference, authors are given the chance to submit a revised paper for publication in the book series Pattern Languages of Program Design by Addison Wesley.

In 2007, an academic journal was started, called Transactions on Pattern Languages of Programming. The editors-in-chief are James Noble and Ralph Johnson and the European editor is Uwe Zdun. The journal is published by Springer-Verlag.

See also
 Pattern language where the name and concept arose from

References

External links 
 The homepage of the Pattern Languages of Programs conferences, organized by the Hillside Group
 The LinkedIn group for PLoP.
 The homepage of the European Pattern Languages of Programs conference, organized by Hillside Europe
 Springer Verlag's homepage for the Transactions on Pattern Languages of Programming journal
 Ward's wiki HistoryOfPatterns including how PLoP came about

Software engineering conferences